Virum station is a station on the Hillerød radial of the S-train network in Copenhagen, Denmark. It serves the neighbourhood of Virum north of Lyngby. The station is served by E trains.

References

S-train (Copenhagen) stations